Commonwealth Film Laboratories was an Australian production company that operated from 1925 to the 1950s. They were formerly located in Surry Hills, New South Wales.

In addition to making films for the Government of Australia, they invested in and provided facilities for several Australian feature films.

Select Credits
Conquest (1936) – short
Eaglets (1935) – short
Mystery Island (1937) – production company
The Adventures of Dot (1938) – short – provided facilities
Typhoon Treasure (1936)
Seven Little Australians (1939) facilities
Australia Has Wings (1941) – short
The Rats of Tobruk (1944) – investor
A Son is Born (1946) – built sets

References

External links
Commonwealth Film Laboratories at Australian Screen Online

Film production companies of Australia
Australian film studios